Nasser al-Din al-Shaer (born 1961) is the former Education Minister of the Palestinian National Authority serving as a member of Hamas. He also served as Deputy Prime Minister in the previous cabinet. After the Hamas takeover of the Gaza Strip, all Hamas ministers in the PNA government were dismissed, including al-Shaer.

Academic background & career
Shaer holds a doctorate in comparative religion from England's University of Manchester, where his dissertation was a comparative study on role of women in Islam and Judaism.  He later worked as a research scholar on Religion & Democracy at New York University, focusing on US history (1998). In 2001 he was appointed Dean of Islamic Law (Shari'a) at An-Najah National University, Nablus. He has published several books and papers on gender, globalization, the peace process, preaching and human rights within religious higher education.

In March 2006 he was appointed Education Minister and Deputy Prime Minister of the Palestinian National Authority.

Attempt to assassinate him
Nasser Al-Shaer was subjected to an assassination attempt, on July 22, 2022, when gunmen fired from inside a vehicle that stopped in front of Al-Shaer's vehicle, wounding him with about 6 bullets in the legs. 

Polling after the event found that a plurality of the population attributed the killing to Fatah or the Palestinian security services.

Arrests
Shaer was first arrested at his home in Ramallah by Israel Defense Forces personnel on August 19, 2006, and was the highest-ranked of about sixty Hamas officials detained by Israel during the 2006 Israel-Gaza conflict. He was released without charges September 27 after a military court ruled that there was insufficient evidence against him to justify his arrest. Shaer was detained again on May 23, 2007 at his home in Nablus by the IDF during overnight raids in the West Bank relating to the Qassam rocket fire towards Israel from Hamas in the Gaza Strip. He was one of 33 Hamas officials that included a number of mayors and lawmakers to be arrested in a series of raids that day. He was released four months later.

On March 19, 2009, al-Shaer and nine other high-ranking Hamas members in the West Bank were detained by Israeli authorities after prisoner exchange negotiations collapsed between Hamas and Israel. He was arrested in Nablus. According to news correspondents, the detentions appeared to be an Israeli attempt to pressure Hamas after the failure of the negotiations, although an Israeli military official said there was "no indication" the arrests were connected to the issue. Meanwhile, Hamas official Ahmed Bahar denounced the actions as "immoral blackmail by the Zionist occupation."

References

External links
Former Deputy PM Ash-Sha'er to be released from Israeli prison 

Living people
Hamas members
1961 births
Government ministers of the Palestinian National Authority
Alumni of the University of Manchester
New York University faculty
Academic staff of An-Najah National University